Wawoi River is a river located in Western Province, Papua New Guinea.

References

External links
Wawoi River
Wawoi River: Papua New Guinea
Topografische Karte New Guinea 1:250,000, Blatt SB 54-16 Aworra River, U.S. Army Map Service

Rivers of Papua New Guinea